The siege of Negroponte was fought between the forces of the Ottoman Empire, led by Sultan Mehmed II in person, and the garrison of the Venetian colony of Negroponte (Chalcis), the capital of the Venetian possession of Euboea in Central Greece. The Ottoman Sultan Mehmed II laid siege to the fortress at Negroponte. It lasted for almost a month, and despite great Ottoman casualties ended in the capture of the city and the island of Euboea by the Ottomans.

Defeat of the relief fleet
The leader of the Venetian relief force was Nicolò Canal, known as "a man of letters rather than a fighter, a learned man readier to read books than direct the affairs of the sea." His fleet had 53 galleys and 18 smaller ships, a fifth of the Ottoman fleet's size. He arrived three weeks into the siege, lost his nerve and withdrew to Samothrace, asking for more help, but only Papal indulgences arrived. Canal could have broken the siege if he had attacked the pontoon bridge the Turks depended on. Wind and tide were in his favour and the Venetians were sailing at a speed  towards it, but he lost his nerve and withdrew. He took his now mutinous fleet back to Venice and Negroponte surrendered the next day.

Aftermath
Because the city had refused to surrender and was taken "by the sword", as was customary, the conquering Ottoman troops were given three days to plunder, loot, and pillage. The Christian men were slaughtered, while women and children were enslaved, and Venetian soldiers were executed. More than 6,000 Venetians and Greeks died in defense of Negroponte. Only 30 known survivors made it back to Venice, consisting of 15 women, 12 children, and 3 men. There are various legends that the garrison commander, bailo Paolo Erizzo, was sawn in half. In fact, the prisoner of the siege Giovanni Maria Angiolello states that Paolo died in the first attack: "Pollo Erizzo, Bailo of the city, who was killed in the first onslaught, that is, at the defense of the Bourkos." Canal was tried, fined, stripped of his rank, and exiled to Portogruaro. Most of these stories are fictitious, though the suffering of the civilians in a city taken by force was quite real. For this reasons, many places, like Athens, chose capitulation over resistance.

References

1470 in Europe
Sieges involving the Ottoman Empire
Sieges involving the Republic of Venice
Battles of the Ottoman–Venetian Wars
Conflicts in 1470
1470s in the Ottoman Empire
Medieval Euboea
History of Chalcis
Battles of Mehmed the Conqueror